Dichomeris diacrita is a moth in the family Gelechiidae. It was described by Alexey Diakonoff in 1968. It is found on Luzon in the Philippines.

The wingspan is about 14.5 mm. The forewings are light milky green with blackish and white markings. There is a transverse series of small blackish scales at one-fifth and another similar transverse series from below two-thirds of the costa, as well as a short transverse mark on the dorsum beyond the middle. The hindwings are dark bronze blackish fuscous.

References

Moths described in 1968
diacrita